Sijtze Klaas de Waard (1796, Groningen – 17 June 1856, Haarlem) was a Dutch Mennonite teacher and minister.

He was trained at the Amsterdam Mennonite seminary and first served in Mensingeweer 1821-1826 and Akkrum 1826-1828 before serving in the Doopsgezinde kerk, Haarlem. Sybrandi gave three addresses to the Haarlem society Maatschappij tot Nut van't Algemeen. From 1832 he was also a member of the Teylers First Society.

References

1796 births
1856 deaths
People from Groningen (city)
Clergy from Haarlem
Dutch Mennonites
Members of Teylers Eerste Genootschap
Mennonite ministers
19th-century Anabaptist ministers